Sobrino is a Spanish surname. Notable people with the surname include:

People 
 Enrique Molina Sobrino, founder of Gemex, a Pepsi bottling company in Mexico
 María Reyes Sobrino (born 1967), Spanish racewalking athlete
 Francisco Sobrino (1932–2014), Spanish sculptor who lived in Paris
 Joaquín Sobrino (born 1982), Spanish cyclist
 Jon Sobrino (born 1938), Jesuit Catholic priest and liberation theologian
 Juan Sobrino, civil engineer specializing in bridge construction
 Rubén Sobrino (born 1992), Spanish professional footballer

Other 
 Sobrino de Botín, a restaurant in Madrid operating since 1725